Ondřej Štěpánek (born 28 November 1979 in Brandýs nad Labem) is a Czech slalom canoeist who competed at the international level from 1994 to 2013. Competing in four Summer Olympics, he won two medals in the C2 event with a silver in 2008 and a bronze in 2004.

Štěpánek also won nine medals at the ICF Canoe Slalom World Championships with six golds (C2: 2006; C2 team: 1999, 2003, 2006, 2007, 2013) and three silvers (C2: 2003, 2013; C2 team: 2010).

He is the overall World Cup champion in C2 from 2005. He also won a total of 13 medals at the European Championships (6 golds, 5 silvers and 2 bronzes).

His partner in the C2 boat throughout the whole of his career was Jaroslav Volf.

World Cup individual podiums

1 European Championship counting for World Cup points
2 World Championship counting for World Cup points
3 Pan American Championship counting for World Cup points

References

2010 ICF Canoe Slalom World Championships 11 September 2010 C2 men's team final results. – accessed 11 September 2010.
DatabaseOlympics.com profile

1979 births
Canoeists at the 2000 Summer Olympics
Canoeists at the 2004 Summer Olympics
Canoeists at the 2008 Summer Olympics
Canoeists at the 2012 Summer Olympics
Czech male canoeists
Living people
Olympic canoeists of the Czech Republic
Olympic bronze medalists for the Czech Republic
Olympic silver medalists for the Czech Republic
Olympic medalists in canoeing
Medalists at the 2008 Summer Olympics
Medalists at the 2004 Summer Olympics
Medalists at the ICF Canoe Slalom World Championships
People from Brandýs nad Labem-Stará Boleslav
Sportspeople from the Central Bohemian Region